CX30 or CX-30 may refer to:

 Changan CX30, a Chinese compact car
 Connexin 30, abbreviated as CX30
 CX 30 Radio Nacional, an Uruguayan radio station
 Mazda CX-30, a Japanese subcompact crossover